William Perry may refer to:

Business
 William H. Perry (businessman) (1832–1906), American businessman and entrepreneur
 William Perry (Queensland businessman) (1835–1891), businessman and politician in Queensland, Australia

Politics and law
 William W. Perry (1834–?), Wisconsin state assemblyman
 William H. Perry (South Carolina politician) (1839–1902), U.S. Representative from South Carolina
 Sir William Perry (New Zealand politician) (1885–1968), member of the New Zealand Legislative Council
 William C. Perry (1900–1985), 34th Chief Justice of the Oregon Supreme Court
 William J. Perry (born 1927), American businessman and former Secretary of Defense
 William H. Perry III (born 1940), Missouri politician

Sports 
 William Perry (boxer) (1819–1880), English boxer known as the "Tipton Slasher"
 William Perry (cricketer) (1830–1913), English cricketer
 William Perry (American football) (born 1962), nicknamed "The Refrigerator"

Others 
 William F. Perry (1823–1901), Confederate brigadier general, first Alabama superintendent of public education, self-taught professor
 William Stevens Perry (1832–1898), American Protestant Episcopal bishop and educator
 William Perry (Scottish priest) (died 1948), Scottish Anglican priest
 William G. Perry (architect) (1883–1975), American architect
 W. J. Perry (William James Perry, 1887–1949), British cultural anthropologist
 William Haggin Perry (1910–1993), American racehorse breeder and owner
 William G. Perry (psychologist) (1913–1998), American developmental psychologist, son of the architect
 William P. Perry (born 1930), American composer and producer

See also
 Bill Perry (disambiguation)
 Perry (surname)
 William Parry (disambiguation)